Bellochantuy is a small coastal hamlet located on the A83 in Argyll, Scotland around  north of Campbeltown.

Argyll Hotel Bellochantuy became the first mainland building in Britain damaged by enemy action when strafed by a German aircraft.

Etymology
The origin of the place name Bellochantuy is Bealach an t-Suidhe, Scottish Gaelic for "the pass of the seat". Local folk etymology alleges the meaning of "fairy grove".

References

Villages in Kintyre